The Men's 200 metre backstroke competition of the swimming events at the 2015 World Aquatics Championships was held on 6 August with the heats and the semifinals and 7 August with the final.

Records
Prior to the competition, the existing world and championship records were as follows.

Results

Heats
The heats were held at 09:56.

Semifinals
The semifinals were held at 18:57.

Semifinal 1

Semifinal 2

Final
The final was held on 7 August at 17:40.

References

Men's 200 metre backstroke